Valea Argovei is a commune in Călărași County, Muntenia, Romania. It is composed of five villages: Lunca, Ostrovu, Siliștea, Valea Argovei and Vlădiceasca.

As of 2007 Valea Argovei has a population of 2,529.

References

Valea Argovei
Localities in Muntenia